Juan Cristóbal Gundlach (17 July 1810 in Marburg – 14 March 1896 in Havana), born Johannes Christoph Gundlach was a Cuban naturalist and taxonomist.

Biography
Gundlach graduated from Marburg University, where his father was professor of physics, as Doctor of Philosophy in 1837. In 1839, he left Europe to make collections on the Caribbean island of Cuba, where he lived ever since. During a short trip to Puerto Rico, at the request of Jesuit fathers to offer assistance in the creation of a zoological collection, in 1868, when revolutionary activities were beginning in Cuba as well as Puerto Rico, he met with don Tomás Blanco, according to naturalist Dr. Agustín Stahl.  A friend of Carl Wilhelm Leopold Krug, who served as German Vice Consul in Mayagüez, Puerto Rico and who paid for some of Gundlach's travels, he visited Puerto Rico in 1873, leaving Havana on 4 June 1873 on the ship Manuela, arriving in Mayagüez, Puerto Rico on 13 June, staying in Puerto Rico for approximately six months. During that trip, Gundlach contributed to the founding of the Civil Institute for Secondary Learning or "Instituto Civil de Segunda Enseñanza".  This institute was closed several months later, in keeping with the Spanish government's policy, expressed to the bishops of Santiago in Cuba and of San Juan, of limiting the opportunities for higher learning, both in Cuba as well as Puerto Rico.  He subsequently travelled from Havana to Puerto Rico's west coast aboard the "Marsella" in September 1875.  He remained in Puerto Rico for approximately one year during that trip. While he was there, he changed his name from Johannes Christoph to its Spanish equivalent Juan Cristóbal. He wrote the first major work on the birds of Cuba, Ornitología Cubana, and his name is commemorated in the scientific names of over sixty species. His collections passed into the care of the Museo Poey in Havana, named after Cuban intellectual Dr. Felipe Poey y Aloy (1799–1891), upon his death in 1896.

In 1986, on the 90th anniversary of his death, Cuba issued a series of postal stamps commemorating Gundlach.

His visits to Puerto Rico were considered so important to the development of the study of natural sciences in Puerto Rico that he is considered "the Father of Natural Sciences in Puerto Rico" and his portrait, painted by Andrés Garcés, hangs in the School of Natural Sciences at the University of Puerto Rico Río Piedras campus.  To honor him, Dr. Agustín Stahl named a species of the cupey tree in his honor as Clusia gundlachi. The Puerto Rico Academy of Arts and Sciences on June 26, 2008, awarded recognitions that carry Gundlach's name to 25 prominent scientists in Puerto Rico.

He wrote Contribucion á la Erpetologia Cubana (1880) and Contribucion á la entomologia Cubana in 4 volumes (1881–1884).

Species and genera named in honor of Gundlach
Accipiter gundlachii – Gundlach's hawk
Bufo gundlachi – Gundlach's Caribbean toad
Eleutherodactylus gundlachi – Gundlach's robber frog
Chordeiles gundlachii – Antillean nighthawk
Cazierus gundlachii – a Cuban scorpion
Dendroica petechia gundlachi – subspecies of yellow warbler (petechia group)
Palinurellus gundlachi – Caribbean furry lobster
Vireo gundlachii – Cuban vireo
Gundlachia – a genus of land snails
Gundlachia – a genus of plants
Nephronaias gundlachii – a land snail
Anolis gundlachi – a Puerto Rican lizard 
Anolis juangundlachi – a Cuban lizard
Clusia gundlachi – a vine endemic to Puerto Rico
Unio gundlachi – a freshwater bivalve
Strumigenys gundlachi – a Neotropical dacetine ant
Camponotus gundlachi – a Cuban carpenter ant
Temnothorax gundlachi – a Cuban ant
Acmaeodera gundlachi – a buprestid beetle
Neolema gundlachiana – a leaf beetle
Lasioglossum (Dialictus) gundlachii – a halictid bee
Parides gundlachianus –Cuban cattleheart, butterfly in the family Papilionidae

See also
 :Category:Taxa named by Juan Gundlach

Bibliography
 Complete bibliography at WorldCat

References

External links
 

 Plants named for Gundlach at IPNI
 
 Vilaro, Juan, Sketch of John Gundlach, Popular Science vol 50, no 42, March 1897 (Google Books)

1810 births
1896 deaths
19th-century Cuban people
19th-century German zoologists
Cuban ornithologists
Cuban zoologists
German entomologists
German ornithologists
German taxonomists
University of Marburg alumni
Scientists from Marburg